Aldon Lynn Nielsen (born 1950 Grand Island, Nebraska) is an American poet, and literary critic.

Life
He was raised in the District of Columbia, where he graduated from the Federal City College and from the George Washington University, with a Ph.D. 
He taught at Howard University, San Jose State University, the University of California, Los Angeles and Loyola Marymount University. He is the George and Barbara Kelly Professor of American Literature in the Pennsylvania State University.

He lives in Pennsylvania and California, where his wife, Anna Everett, teaches at U.C. Santa Barbara. Nielsen loves to wear hats and owns several tablets.

Awards
 Larry Neal Award for poetry 
 two Gertrude Stein Awards for innovation. 
 SAMLA Studies Prize, a Myers Citation and the Kayden Award for best book in the humanities, for Reading Race
 Josephine Miles Award, for Integral Music: Languages of African American Innovation
 American Book Award for Don't deny my name: words and music and the black intellectual tradition
 Darwin Turner Award

Works

Poetry
 Heat Strings
 Evacuation Routes, Score, 1994

Criticism
  (reprint)
 
 

 
 Writing between the Lines

 Integral Music: Languages of African American Innovation

As editor

Anthologies

References

External links
"Author's blog"
"Interview with Aldon Lynn Nielsen", May 19, 2006

1948 births
American male poets
American literary critics
Living people
University of the District of Columbia alumni
George Washington University alumni
Howard University faculty
San Jose State University faculty
University of California, Los Angeles faculty
Loyola Marymount University faculty
Pennsylvania State University faculty
People from Grand Island, Nebraska
PEN Oakland/Josephine Miles Literary Award winners
American Book Award winners
American male non-fiction writers